Plant Physiology is a monthly peer-reviewed scientific journal that covers research on physiology, biochemistry, cellular and molecular biology, genetics, biophysics, and environmental biology of plants. The journal has been published since 1926 by the American Society of Plant Biologists. The current editor-in-chief is Yunde Zhao (University of California San Diego. According to the Journal Citation Reports, the journal has a 2021 impact factor of 8.005.

References

External links 
 

Botany journals
Publications established in 1926
Monthly journals
English-language journals